D. Damodaran Potti was an Indian politician who served as Speaker of the Kerala Legislative Assembly from March 15, 1967 to October 21, 1970 and Minister for Public Works during Sankar ministry.

Personal life 
He was born in 27 April 1921 in Kottarakkara. His parents were K. Damodaran Potti and Aryadevi. His married to P. V. Sreedevi Antharjanam and got one son and three daughter. He studied from St. Berchmans College and Government Arts College, Thiruvananthapuram and got Bachelors’ Degree in Law from Government Law College, Thiruvananthapuram. In 29 January 1970, he suspended five opposition members who attacked him. He died in 15 November 2002.

References 

1921 births
Kerala MLAs 1967–1970
2002 deaths